Nothing Else Matters is a 1920 British film, written by Hugh E. Wright, and directed by George Pearson. This was the screen debut of Mabel Poulton and Betty Balfour who went on to become leading British stars of the 1920s.

Plot
A comedy/drama genre film, about the life of a British Music Hall comic.

Cast
Hugh E. Wright
Moyna Macgill
Betty Balfour
George Keene
Mabel Poulton
Arthur Cleave
Alec Thompson
Leal Douglas
Polly Emery
Reginald Denham

External links

1920 films
British black-and-white films
Films directed by George Pearson
British silent feature films
British comedy-drama films
1920 comedy-drama films
1920s British films
Silent comedy films
1920s English-language films